Gyandil Das (1821–1883) was a Nepalese poet and social reformer, later known as a "Saint". He opposed existing social discrimination such as prevalent caste biases and gender-based violence through his written compositions.

Gyandil Das was born to a Brahmin family in a village near Fikkal, in Eastern Nepal. He had a deep knowledge of Vedas and Puranas. Belonging to a higher Brahmin caste, he showed empathy towards the lower caste people suppressed by the higher caste. Gyandil began to write against social injustices, which incited Jung Bahadur Rana to arrest and imprison him for six months. After being freed, he joined the prominent Josmani religious sect and inducted the Nirguna (attribute-less God) concept in the Nepali devotional poetry. He composed 'Udayalahari''' in 1877, in Darjeeling, which consists of verses in devotion to the Nirguna Brahma.

Gyandil Das was bestowed the Josmani Dikshya by his Guru, Shyamdil Das. After becoming a Josmani follower, he visited many places in Eastern Nepal, Darjeeling, and Sikkim to promote and expand the religious ideology.

Poetry
Gyandil Das composed poems, devotional songs and verses. Most of his works are written in traditional jhyaure meter 5-5-6. He has authored Tungna Bhajans, Jhyaure Bhajans and Udayalahari''.

He died in Geiling, Western Sikkim, in 1883. The Nepal Government honored him by publishing a Saint Gyandil Das postage stamp in 1980.

See also
List of Nepalese poets

References

Nepalese male poets
1821 births
1883 deaths
19th-century Nepalese poets
People from Ilam District